Whitchurch is a market town in the north of Shropshire, England. At the 2011 Census, the population of the town was 9,781. Whitchurch is the oldest continuously inhabited town in Shropshire. Notable people who have lived in Whitchurch include the composer Sir Edward German, and illustrator Randolph Caldecott.

History

Early times
There is evidence from various discovered artefacts that people lived in this area about 3,000 BC.  Flakes of flint from the Neolithic era were found in nearby Dearnford Farm.

Roman times
Originally a settlement founded by the Romans about AD 52–70 called Mediolanum ( "Midfield" or "Middle of the Plain"), it stood on a major Roman road between Chester and Wroxeter. It was listed on the Antonine Itinerary but is not the Mediolanum of Ptolemy's Geography, which was in central Wales. Local Roman artefacts can be seen at the Whitchurch Heritage Centre.

In 2016, archaeologists discovered the remains of a Roman wooden trackway, a number of structural timbers, a large amount of Roman pottery and fifteen leather shoes during work on a culvert in Whitchurch. In 2018, a collection of 37 small Roman coins was unearthed at Hollyhurst near Whitchurch. The small denomination, brass or copper alloy coins, known as Dupondii and Asses, were from the reign of the Emperor Trajan, AD 98–117. Some dated back to between AD 69–79 from the time of Emperor Vespasian.

Middle Ages
In 1066, Whitchurch was called Westune ('west farmstead'), probably for its location on the western edge of Shropshire, bordering the north Welsh Marches. Before the Norman conquest of England, the area had been held by Harold Godwinson. After the conquest, Whitchurch's location on the marches would require the Lords of Whitchurch to engage in military activity. There was a castle at Whitchurch, possibly built by the same Earl of Surrey, which would predate the birth of Ralph. The Domesday Book estimates that the property was worth £10 annually, having been worth £8 in the reign of Edward the Confessor (1042–1066).

By the time it was recorded in the Domesday Book (1086), Whitchurch was held by William de Warenne, 1st Earl of Surrey, and Roger de Montgomery. It was part of the hundred of Hodnet.

The surrounding hamlets became townships and Dodtune ('the settlement of Dodda's people') is now fully integrated into Whitchurch as Dodington. The first church was built on the hill in AD 912. After the Norman Conquest a motte and bailey castle and a new white Grinshill stone church were built. Westune became Album Monasterium ('White Church'). The name Whitchurch is from the Middle English for "White Church", referring to a church constructed of white stone in the Norman period. The area was also known as Album Monasterium and Blancminster, and the Warennes of Whitchurch were often surnamed de Albo Monasterio in contemporary writings. It is supposed that the church was built by William de Warenne, 1st Earl of Surrey.

In 1377 the Whitchurch estates passed to the Talbot family. It was sold by the Talbots to Thomas Egerton, from whom it passed to the earls of Bridgwater and eventually to Earl Brownlow.

The town was granted market status in the 14th century. The replacement third church collapsed in July 1711 and the present Queen Anne parish church of St Alkmund was immediately constructed to take its place. It was consecrated in 1713.

Lords of Whitchurch
William fitz Ranulf is the earliest individual of the Warenne family recorded as the Lord of Whitchurch, Shropshire, first appearing in the Shropshire Pipe Roll of 1176. In 1859, Robert Eyton considered it likely that Ralph, son of William de Warenne, 2nd Earl of Surrey, was the father of William and that he first held that title. However, other theories have been put forward.

Later history
During the reign of Henry I in the 12th century, Whitchurch was in the North Division of Bradford Hundred which by the 1820s was referred to as North Bradford Hundred. In the 18th Century many of the earlier timber-framed buildings were refaced in the more fashionable brick. New elegant Georgian houses were built at the southern end of the High Street and in Dodington.

As dairy farming became more profitable Whitchurch developed as a centre for Cheshire cheese production. Cheese fairs were held on every third Wednesday when farm cheeses were brought into town for sale. Cheese and other goods could be easily transported to wider markets when the Whitchurch Arm of Thomas Telford's Llangollen Canal was opened in 1811. The railway station was opened in 1858 on the first railway line in North Shropshire, running from Crewe to Shrewsbury.

During the Second World War a secret Y station for enemy signals interception operated in Whitchurch at the Old Rectory in Claypit Street, run by the Foreign Office.

On 23 November 1981, an F1/T2 tornado passed through Whitchurch as part of the record-breaking nationwide tornado outbreak on that day. The Whitchurch tornado was the longest-lived tornado of the entire outbreak, having first touched down 35 miles away in the south Shropshire village of Norbury. After passing through Whitchurch, the tornado dissipated.

Governance

Town
Whitchurch has its own town council which is responsible for street lights, parks and the civic centre which is located in the centre of the town. The council organises various events throughout the year including markets and the Christmas Lights.

County
The town is part of Shropshire Council which is the local authority for Shropshire (excluding Telford and Wrekin). It is a unitary authority, having the powers of a non-metropolitan county and district council combined. The residents of Whitchurch elect three councillors to this council.

National
The town is located within the North Shropshire parliamentary constituency.  This constituency is largely rural with the main urban centres being Oswestry, Market Drayton and Whitchurch. It has been in existence since 1832 although it was abolished in 1885 but re-established in 1983.  The residents of the constituency elect one MP; the seat is currently held by Helen Morgan (Liberal Democrats) who was elected in the 2021 North Shropshire by-election following the resignation of Owen Paterson (Conservative Party).

Landmarks

Buildings
There are currently over 100 listed buildings in Whitchurch, including the churches detailed in the religion section lower down.

In the picture to the left is the street named Bargates. At the top on the left is St Alkmund's Church (rebuilt 1712–13). 
This is followed by the former almhouses by Samuel Higginson (1697).  This is followed by the former girls' school founded by Jane Higginson (1708) and then the old Whitchurch Grammar School which was founded in 1548. The grammar school building dates from 1708 (Grade II listed) and was latterly used as an infants' school. Further buildings were added in 1848 and 1926. All have now been converted into apartments.

Two of the oldest buildings in Whitchurch include the Old Eagles pub built in the 16th century and 17, 19 and 21 Watergate Street, otherwise known as Raven Yard Antiques. The properties 17, 19 and 21 Watergate were first built in 1625 and were called the Raven's Inn. Over the last four centuries, the Raven's Inn has seen a great deal of alteration but more recently has seen a significant part of the property restored to its original half timbered facade. 17-19 Watergate exists as a private property and 21 Watergate is now called Raven Yard Antiques, a family owned antiques business with a speciality in Victorian military uniforms.

Streets
The street names in the town centre reflect the changing history of the town.
 Roman: Pepper Street, a common name in former Roman settlements. It is a derivation of the Roman Via Piperatica, the street on which pepper and spices were sold.
 Norse: Several streets end in 'gate' which is Norse for street (e.g., Watergate, Highgate, Bargates). Watergate Street being named after the old Medieval or Roman Watergate which used to exist.  Others refer to the castle which was located here (e.g., Castle Hill or Yardington referring to the castle yard).
 Modern: Some refer to local industry (e.g., Claypit Street, clay was used for making bricks; Mill Street, named after the local water mill; and Bark Hill, bark was used for tanning.

Place names
The areas of Whitchurch have interesting names. These include:
 Dodington – this is derived from Dodtune (the settlement of the people of Dodda – a local Anglo-Saxon chieftain)
 Chemistry – this is derived from an oak-acid making business located nearby which was used in the tanning industry in the town

Transport

Roads
Whitchurch has roads to Wrexham, Nantwich, Chester and Shrewsbury; the A41/A49 bypass opened in 1992. There are bus services from Whitchurch to surrounding settlements including Chester, Nantwich, Wrexham and Shrewsbury.

Railway
Whitchurch railway station is on the former London and North Western (later part of the LMS) line from Crewe down the English side of the Welsh border (the Welsh Marches Line) toward Cardiff. However, Whitchurch was once the junction for the main line of the Cambrian Railways, but the section from Whitchurch to Welshpool (Buttington Junction), via Ellesmere, Whittington, Oswestry and Llanymynech, closed on 18 January 1965 in favour of the more viable alternative route via Shrewsbury. Whitchurch was also the junction for the Whitchurch and Tattenhall Railway or Chester to Whitchurch branch line, another part of the London and North Western, running via Malpas. The line closed to regular services on 16 September 1957, but use by diverted passenger trains continued until 8 December 1963.

Canals
Whitchurch has its own short arm of the Llangollen Canal and the town centre can be reached by a walk of approximately 1 mile along the Whitchurch Waterways Country Park, the last stage of the Sandstone Trail. The Whitchurch Arm is managed by a charity group of local volunteers.

Economy

Historically the town has been the centre of cheese-making. Today Belton Cheese continues to be a major employer.  It has been in existence since 1922.

The major employer in the town now is Grocontinental, a logistics provider to the food industry, which employs over 350 people. This family firm which was established in 1941 was taken over by the Dutch multinational AGRO Merchants in 2017.

The town also provides a range of services for the surrounding countryside of the North Shropshire Plain. The majority of retail stores in Whitchurch are small to medium-sized businesses concentrated in the High Street, Watergate street and Green End. There is a Tesco supermarket in the town centre (White Lion Meadow), a smaller Lidl store and a larger Sainsbury's supermarket in London Road. An Aldi store opened on the edge of town in 2020.

There are several speciality food shops including Powell's Pork Pie shop, which has been selling traditional pork pies for four generations and won the Great British Pork Pie Bronze Award.  On the High Street is located Walker's Bakery and Cafe which sells bread and cakes which are baked on the premises. Watergate Street airs a number of businesses including the Pie Hole and Raven Yard Antiques.

The town was the home of the J. B. Joyce tower clocks company, established in 1690, the earliest tower clock-making company in the world, which earned Whitchurch a reputation as the home of tower clocks. Joyce's timepieces can be found as far afield as Singapore, Kabul and Cape Town (see right). The firm also helped to build Big Ben in London. However, J. B. Joyce have now left and an auction house has moved into the building. Whitchurch also has a local chamber of commerce recently retitled as the Whitchurch Business Group, an organisation setup with the aim of improving the town's business environment.

By rail Whitchurch is within commuting distance of Liverpool and Manchester (both about one hour north) and Shrewsbury (30 minutes south).

Arts and culture

There are a wide range of arts and culture activities, festivals and facilities and societies in Whitchurch.

Antiques Businesses
 Raven Yard Antiques – A family owned antiques business located near the town centre on Watergate Street.
 Trevanion's Antiques Auctioneers – Owned by TV Celebrity Christina Trevanion.

Cultural activities

 Whitchurch Poetry Open Mic - new poetry performances, held on the third Monday of every month.

Cultural venues and facilities

 Alderford Lake - various cultural performances throughout the year 
 Bookshrop - local bookshop acting as a hub for many cultural activities 
 Whitchurch Civic Centre – hosts various performances throughout the year. It also contains a public library. 
 Whitchurch Heritage Centre.
 Talbot Theatre – located in the Leisure Centre at the Sir John Talbot School.  It offers regular theatrical and musical events as well as film.
 Doodle Alley.
 Whitchurch Amateur Operatic and Dramatic Society.
 Whitchurch Little Theatre Group on Facebook.

Festivals

 Blackberry Fair 
 Party in the Park
 Whitchurch Food and Drink festival

The periodic televised Sir Edward German Music Festival, hosted by St Alkmund's and St John's churches, also uses Sir John Talbot's Technology College as a venue. The first festival was held in 2006 and the second in April 2009. Participants have included local choirs and primary schools, including Prees, Lower Heath and White House, as well as internationally known musicians and orchestras.

Historic cultural activities

On 19 January 1963 The Beatles played in the old Town Hall Ballroom (now the location of the town Civic Centre). That night a recording of the group appeared on the television show Thank Your Lucky Stars, an appearance which changed their fortunes. "Please Please Me" had just been released as a single.

Sport
Whitchurch Rugby Club currently competes in the Midlands 1 West league, the sixth tier of English rugby. Founded in 1936, the club plays at Edgeley Park and has a full complement of mini rugby and junior teams as well as under-19s (Colts), a ladies team and four senior teams. In 1998–99, it was promoted to National Division Three North, a position it maintained until the 2002–03 season.

The local football club, Whitchurch Alport F.C., was founded in 1946. It is named after Alport Farm in Alport Road, which was the home of local footballer, Coley Maddocks, killed in the Second World War. They were founder members of the Cheshire Football League and played in that league until 2012, before a spell in the Mercian Regional Football League. Since 2015, Whitchurch Alport has played in the North West Counties Football League premier Division.

The Chester Road Bowling Club has been in existence since 1888. It was originally a bowling and tennis club. It has over 160 members and fields 23 teams (mostly men and women) in six different leagues. Another bowling club, the Whitchurch and District, was founded in 1924.

Whitchurch Leisure Centre is located at the Sir John Talbot School on the edge of town. It offers a range of exercise facilities and classes.

The Whitchurch Walkers is an active group of residents interested in walking and the protection of footpaths. It organises a range of events, including an annual walking festival. The Sandstone Trail starts/end at the Whitchurch arm of the canal. It forms part of the Shropshire Way.

On the northern edge of the town is the Macdonald Hill Valley Hotel, which has a fitness centre, a swimming pool and two golf courses.

Since August 2019, Alderford Lake, just to the south of the town, has hosted a parkrun, which is a free, weekly timed 5 km run/walk, every Saturday morning at 9am.

Education

Whitchurch has a long history of schools. Whitchurch Grammar School was established in 1548 by Rev Sir John Talbot, the Rector of Whitchurch in the 1540s.  The school opened in 1550 making it one of the oldest schools in England.  It was restricted to boys.  Next door to it a school for girls was established.  They both closed in 1936 and became part of the new Sir John Talbot’s School which is located on the edge of the town. It has about 500 students aged 11–18. This school is now part of the Marches Academy Trust.

The main primary school in the town is Whitchurch CE Junior School, which has about 300 pupils aged 7–11.  Younger children attend Whitchurch CE Infant and Nursery School.

There is an active branch of the University of the Third Age with over 350 members.

Religion

The town's most prominent place of worship is St Alkmund's Church of England parish church, built in 1712 of red sandstone on the site of a Norman church. It is a Grade I listed building. St Catherine's in Dodington was built in 1836 as a chapel of ease for St Alkmund's, which at that time was over-crowded. It is Grade II listed, but ceased to be used for worship in the 1970s. It featured in the 1995 BBC One Foot in the Past programme, when it was being used as a builder's store. It has now been converted into apartments.

John Wesley, the founder of the Methodist movement, preached in Whitchurch on 18 April 1781. St John's Methodist Church, built in 1879, stands on the corner of St John's Street and Brownlow Street. It is Grade II listed. The Wesleyan Chapel in St Mary's Street, which opened in 1810, closed shortly after St John's opened and is now the Whitchurch Heritage Centre. The Primitive Methodist Chapel in Castle Hill opened in 1866 and closed in the 1970s.

The Dodington United Reformed (formerly Congregational) Church (built in 1815 and Grade II listed) is now closed, as is the Dodington Presbyterian Chapel (built in 1707). A Baptist chapel was built in Green End in 1820 but closed in 1939; it is now an antique showroom.

St George's Catholic Church has been located in Claypit Street since 1878.

Whitchurch Cemetery includes 91 Commonwealth War Graves Commission (CWGC) burials: 24 from the First World War, in scattered plots, and 67 from the Second World War, mostly grouped in a CWGC section; 52 of the latter are Polish or Czechoslovak, as No. 4 Polish General Hospital was at Iscoyd Park just over the border in Wales. The ashes of locally born composer Sir Edward German are also buried at the cemetery.

Notable people

Early times 

Sir Henry Percy (Sir Harry Hotspur) (1364–1403), killed at the Battle of Shrewsbury and buried in Whitchurch, only for his body to be later exhumed and quartered. 
 Sir John Talbot ( 1384–1453), a warrior commander who in 1429 fought French armies inspired by Joan of Arc.  His heart is buried under the porch of St Alkmund's Church.   Talbot is a major character in Shakespeare's Henry VI, Part I. 
 Rev. Sir John Talbot (c. 1490–1549), Rector of Whitchurch in 1540s, founded Whitchurch Grammar School, it closed in 1938 and moved to Sir John Talbot’s School.
 Abraham Wheelock (1593 in Whitchurch–1653), linguist, first Adams Professor of Arabic at the University of Cambridge
 Nicholas Bernard (c. 1600–1661), pamphleteer, former dean of Ardagh in Ireland and chaplain to Oliver Cromwell, was appointed rector of the parish in 1660 and buried at St Alkmund's.
 Philip Henry (1631–1696), nonconformist clergyman and Vicar of nearby Worthenbury.
 Joseph Bromfield (1744 probably in Whitchurch–1824), notable English plasterer and architect
 John Pridden (1758–1825), English cleric and antiquary. His mother was of a Whitchurch family
 Reginald Heber (1783–1826), Rector of Hodnet and Bishop of Calcutta attended Whitchurch Grammar School.
 Thomas Corser (1793 in Whitchurch–1876), literary scholar and Church of England clergyman.

More modern times
 Randolph Caldecott (1846–1886), illustrator, lived in the town, the town's buildings feature in his work.
 Sir Edward German (1862 in Whitchurch–1936), composer, was born in the town in what is now a pub: the Old Town Hall Vaults. He is buried in the local cemetery and commemorated in a local street.
 Percy Newton (1904 in Whitchurch–1993), professional footballer 
 Lucy Appleby MBE (1920–2008), traditional cheesemaker
 Ken Dodd OBE (1928–2018), comedian and singer; although he lived in Knotty Ash he kept a country house near Whitchurch for fifty years.
 Elizabeth Fritsch CBE (born 1940 in Whitchurch) is a studio potter and ceramic artist.
 Lorna Sage (1943 in Whitchurch – 2001), literary critic and author, attended the girls' high school.
 Stuart Mason (1948 in Whitchurch – 2008), professional footballer,  began his career with Whitchurch Alport.
 Owen Paterson (born 1956 in Whitchurch) former environment secretary and Conservative MP for North Shropshire 1997-2021
 Judy Hunt, (born 1957) previously Archdeacon of Suffolk, has been resident Rector of Whitchurch since 2012.
 Kate Long, (born 1964) novelist, author of The Bad Mother's Handbook, moved to Whitchurch in 1990.
 Christina Trevanion (born 1981), partner in auctioneering firm of Trevanion & Dean, and TV personality.

Twin town 
Whitchurch is twinned with

See also
Listed buildings in Whitchurch Rural
Listed buildings in Whitchurch Urban

References

 
Civil parishes in Shropshire
Market towns in Shropshire
Populated places established in the 1st century
Towns in Shropshire
Towns of the Welsh Marches